Mohammedali Yaseen Taha (Kurdish: محه‌مه‌دعه‌لی یاسین تاها; born 1983) is a Kurdish writer, academic, politician and poet. He is currently the vice president for Administration, finance and student affairs at Nawroz University, a private higher-education university based in Duhok, Kurdistan Region, Iraq. He is also an associate researcher at Institute of Social Science (ICS) at University of Lisbon and founding president of Open Think Tank in Kurdistan Region of Iraq.

Early life 
Taha was born in February 11, 1983 in Tabriz, Iran where his family had fled to as political refugees after the 1975 Algiers Agreement between Iran and Iraq and the collapse of Kurdish revolutionary movement Iraqi–Kurdish conflict led by Mustafa Barzani. He is fluent in six languages, Kurdish, Persian, Turkish, Azeri, English, and a basic knowledge of Arabic and Portuguese.

He returned to Iraq with his family in 1995 after the 1991 Uprising of the Kurds in the North of Iraq and the establishment of a de facto autonomy in Kurdistan Region of Iraq. In 2001 he started to work with local newspapers and magazines as a reporter and later as an editor. He holds a Bachelor of Arts in English Language and Literature from University of Duhok in 2007. He obtained his Master degree in Peace and Conflict Studies from University for Peace in San Jose, Costa Rica. Later, he went to Lisbon, Portugal where he concluded PhD degree in Comparative Politics from University of Lisbon.

Published books 
Taha’s first poetry collection “Dîsan Bê Te” was published in 2009, second book “Hevwexerê Bayi” in 2012 and “3 Tablo” in 2016. He has also published short stories in various literary publications in Kurdistan region. His is the author of the academic book Media and Politics in Kurdistan: How Politics and Media are Locked in an Embrace (Rowman and Littlefield Publishers, Lexington Books, 2020).

Political career and election to Kurdistan Parliament 
Taha, as an active member of KDP since 1998 worked in different party organizations such as Kurdistan Students Union and KDP first branch in Duhok. In September 2013, he run for the parliament election with the Kurdistan Democratic Party and he won the elections and became member of Kurdistan Parliament. He was then elected by the fraction as a member of the KDP fraction’s presidency board and also the official spokesperson of the fraction in the parliament.

References

External links 
 Mohammedali Yaseen Taha

Members of the Kurdistan Region Parliament
Kurdistan Democratic Party politicians
1983 births
Living people